The 2015 Campeonato Tocantinense de Futebol was the 23rd edition of the Tocantins's top professional football league. The competition began on 7 March and ended on 7 June. Tocantinópolis won the championship for the 3rd time.

First stage

Final stage

Finals

Tocantinópolis won for having the best record in the league.

References 

Tocantins
Campeonato Tocantinense